Lozove a village in Bakhmut Raion (district) in Donetsk Oblast of eastern Ukraine, at 72.5 km NNE from the centre of Donetsk city.

The War in Donbass, that started in mid-April 2014, has brought along both civilian and military casualties.

References

Villages in Bakhmut Raion